Jon Myong-song (born 19 August 1993) is a male North Korean weightlifter. He won the bronze medal in the men's 85 kg event at the 2018 Asian Games held in Jakarta, Indonesia.

In 2015, he won the silver medal in the men's 77 kg event at the 2015 Asian Weightlifting Championships held in Phuket, Thailand.

References 

Living people
1993 births
Place of birth missing (living people)
North Korean male weightlifters
Weightlifters at the 2018 Asian Games
Medalists at the 2018 Asian Games
Asian Games bronze medalists for North Korea
Asian Games medalists in weightlifting
21st-century North Korean people